Soldier Mountain is a mountain located in the Cascade Range of northwest Shasta County, California, which stands at 1,696 m (5,531 ft). It is around 4.2 km (2.6 mi) south of Dana, California.

Atop the mountain, there is an old fire lookout tower accessible via dirt road.

See also 

 Cascade Range

References 

Mountains of California
Mountains of Shasta County, California